Cyril Suk and Michael Tebbutt were the defending champions, but lost in the quarterfinals this year.

Justin Gimelstob and Richey Reneberg won the title, defeating Mark Knowles and Sandon Stolle 6–4, 6–7(4–7), 6–3 in the final.

Seeds

Draw

Finals

References

External links
 Main draw

Tennis Channel Open
1999 ATP Tour
1999 Tennis Channel Open